Kissi may refer to the following :

 Kissi, Burkina Faso, an African archaeological site
 Kissi language, of the Niger–Congo family
 Kissi penny, an iron currency in West Africa
 Kissi people, in Guinea, Sierra Leone and Liberia
 Greek name of Roman Cissi in Mauretania Caesariensis (now Djinet in Algeria)